This article lists the known enemies of Aquaman.

Supervillains and themed criminals

Villains from comics in other media
A number of villains from the comic books have made an appearance, or appearances, in Aquaman related live-action media.

Related lists
 List of Aquaman supporting characters
 List of Batman family enemies
 List of Superman enemies
 List of Wonder Woman enemies
 List of Green Lantern enemies

References

External links
Aquaman Who's Who

Enemies
Lists of DC Comics characters
DC Comics Atlanteans
Lists of DC Comics supervillains